Kerala Natanam (കേരള നടനം) (Kerala Dance) is a new style of dance that is now recognised as a distinct art form evolved from Kathakali, a form of Indian dance-drama. The Indian dancer Guru Gopinath (ഗുരു ഗോപിനാഥ്‌) a well-trained Kathakali artist and his wife Thankamani Gopinath who was the first student of Mohiniyattam in Kerala Kalamandalam developed a unique structure for teaching and performing classical dance forms of India whose origins are from Kathakali. Solo, duets, dance dramas and traditional folk dances were the material they chose.

Guru Gopinath and Thankamani's dance programs found traditional pieces existing side by side with those modified to present a variety of themes. Their style relied heavily on the angika abhinaya (body movements and gestures) and  satvika abhinaya (facial expressions) from Kathakali. The major stance of Kathakali was changed by Gopinath to a more convenient pose that could rest well with the tribhanga concept.

Another significant deviation was in aharya abhinaya (costume mode) where they adopted costumes and facial makeup to suit the role. Thus, in a dance on Jesus Christ, the dancer dressed like Christ. In social dances the artists wore the dress of labourers, peasants, folk, etc. Likewise roles of Srikrishna, king, snake charmer, hunter had the appropriate attire. For the first time Carnatic music compositions used for concerts were rendered into dance forms by Gopinath. Unlike traditional Kathakali and Mohini attam, a variety musical instruments were added to his presentations.

Even though during his lifetime Guru Gopinath did not give a name to his style, after his death the movement to give his style a name gained momentum. In 1993, during the Global Conference on Guru Gopinath and Kerala Nadanam held in Trivandrum, a Sanskrit definition was given to this style by his students: Keraleeya Shaastriya Sargaathmaka Nrittham — "A traditional creative dance style originating from Kerala."

Kerala Nadanam can be performed in three ways: Ekamga Nadanam (solo), Samgha Nadanam (group), Nataka Nadanam (dance drama enacting a story). Male–female pair dancing is a distinct style in Kerala Nadanam. So also he has extended the dance drama to five or six hours long performance called Indian ballets.

Prominent artists

Guru Chandrasekharan (1916–1998) 

Guru Chandrasekharan was a great Indian dancer and choreographer who was born in Trivandrum, Kerala in 1916. His father was NK Nair (Kunju Krishna Kurup), a notable oil painter. While studying at the university, he started practicing dance without informing his parents. He studied Kathakali dance under the guidance of Guru Gopinath. During that period, Gopinath received royal patronage from the Travancore palace and a dance school named Sri Chithrodaya Nartha Kalalayam was established by the government at Poojappura, Travancore. Chandrasekharan was one of the first students. After some time, Chandrasekharan learnt Kathakali under Nedumudi Narayana Kurup who was also a palace kathakali artiste. Later, he organized his own troupe and conducted performances around India. Social themes were rarely used in classical dances at the time. He has directed and choreographed several social themes in dance.
 
In 1943, on an invitation from the government, he took his troupe to Alexandria, Egypt; the Middle East; and Italy for military entertainment as the Indian Army was engaged in World War II. At the close of the war in 1946, he again tried to go to East Asia, but the tour ended in Ceylon.

He has served as a dance professor at Shantiniketan, West Bengal, as a member of the Kerala University Senate, Board of Director at Kerala Kalamandalam governing body, Advisory Committee member Malayalam Encyclopedia, visiting dance professor of Swathi Thirunal College of Music, and as a founder member of the director board of the Bala Bhavan, Trivandrum.

In the late forties, at the insistence of some of his friends, he composed and presented the 'Voice of Travancore,' a political theme in dance form, which depicted the autocratic rule of the Dewan, Sir CP Ramaswamy Iyer and people's movement of resistance thereon. However, Sir CP was an admirer of Chandrasekharan's art. However, Chandrasekharan received his highest appreciation in the All India Educational Conference held at Trivandrum in 1946.

According to the report:

"The Nataraja Thandava was presented in a remarkable manner by Chandrasekharan. When he presented the Hunter Dance, his joy of being the monarch of all he surveyed in the forest was vividly perceivable. He aroused tragic sentiments to a remarkable extent while he was experiencing suicidal agony as he was bitten by a snake. As he entered 'Ardhanareeswara,' here the body was responding to a double call of vigour and grace. It was perhaps more than what an Uday Shankar could do."

Another composition of his is 'Polinja Deepam' (the light that failed) depicting the sad end of Mahatma Gandhi, which he played in 1948.

In 1949 he joined in the Viswabharathi University (Shantiniketan) as a professor of Kathakali dance. During this time, he composed and portrayed Rabindranath Tagore's famous dance dramas, Chitrangada, Chandalika, etc. in cities of North India including New Delhi and Calcutta. In Viswabharathi, he had the opportunity to get acquainted with many dance forms including those from Kandi, Bali, Burma, etc. During this period in Shantiniketan, he got acquainted with Prof. Humayun Kabir, Zakir Hussain (Former President of India) who were then frequent visitors of Shantiniketan. All these great personalities  praised Chandrasekharan for his talent in performing art: "Chandrasekharan has great expressiveness and was able to communicate shades of feeling with subtlety and power. His sense of rhythm and dramatic interpretation marks him out as an artist of distinction."

Poet Harindranth Chatopadhyaya wrote to him on 21 February 1952:

"Courage is this that single willed, unaided lone you build and build
Which shows you have the spirits pluck, so from the heart I wish you luck."

SK George, a Gandhian disciple and a former director of Deenabandhu Bhavan, Shantiniketan, said about him: 

"Sri Chandrasekharan was one of the best teachers of Art that Shantiniketan has had and did much to rouse interest in its study among students from various parts of the country. He delighted visitors to Shantiniketan from all parts of the world during his stay there, by the finished technique of his art and has received glowing testimonials from many of them, including delegates to the World Pacifist meeting. In Gurudev's dance dramas like 'Chandalika,' 'Chitrangada' and 'Syama' presented in Shantiniketan and outside, he took the leading parts."

After a couple of years, he came back from Viswabharathi and started his own school at Trivandrum in the name Prathibha Nrithakala Kendra. During 1954, he performed Thilakkunna Mannu (Simmering Sand) that had a social theme advocating agrarian revolution. It has received wide acclamation from celebrated persons like President Rajendra Prasad and Dr. Radhakrishnan.

Chandrasekharan's creative contributions include such compositions as 'Voice of Travancore,' 'Manishada,' 'Siva Thandavam,' 'Ganesh Nritham,' 'Ardhanareeswara,' 'Surya Nritham,' 'Geethopadesam,' Kalidasa's 'Kumara Sambhavam,' 'Sakunthalam,' Kumaran Asan's 'Chandala Bhikshuki,' Vallathol's 'Magdalana Maria,' 'Guruvum Sishyanum,' Vayalar's 'Ayisha,' Changampuzha's 'Ramanan' and 'Markandeyan,' 'Mohini Rugmangada,' 'Savithri,' 'Dakshayagam,' 'Ekalavyan,' 'Chilappadikaram,' Greek story 'Pygmalion,' Chinese story 'Fisherman's Revenge,' Japanese story 'Esashiyuvo' (Prapidiyan Pathalathil), Bible story 'Salome' and many more. He successfully composed and performed several ballets such as 'Sri Guruvayurappan,' 'Kumara Sambhavam,' 'Sri Ayyappan,' 'Hrishya Sringan' and 'Sri Hanuman.'

He produced another ballet named Himavante Makkal (Children of the Himalayas) in 1964 on the background of the India's history, which concluded with the Chinese attack on India in 1962. After seeing it, VV Giri, then governor of Kerala, was so happy that he invited Chandrasekharan to Raj Bhavan and honored him. Here is an extract from his complimentary remarks.

"I am delighted to witness the performance of a dance drama based on National Integration presented by Pratibha Nrithakala Kendra, Trivandrum, and directed by the famous and distinguished dancer Chandrasekharan. This play describes the various periods through which we have passed from Vedic period up to the present day. It is a most thought provoking play and one who attends this show will feel enthused and inspired and would strengthen his spirit of patriotism and love of sacrifice for his country."

In 1965, Chandrasekharan composed an opera which was the first of its kind in Malayalam as well as in any other Indian language. The opera was based on the Mahabharata character Karnan. Chandrasekharan himself played the role of Karna while nearly hundred others took part in it, which was presented in Trivandrum for more than a month. The opera was produced by Kala Nilayam permanent Theatres. Chandrasekharan later started his own permanent stage called Prathibha Opera House and produced another opera entitled 'Bhishmar' on the Mahabharata hero which was an artistic success, but financially a flop, which forced him to withdraw from the scene partly. However, he continued his activities till 1980.

At a public meeting in connection with his Shashtiabdapurthi (60th birthday) at Hassan Marrikar Hall, Trivandrum, under the chairmanship of Prof. Ayappa Panicker, he was conferred the title of 'Guru' by the public of Trivandrum. He was honoured with an award by Kerala Sangeetha Nataka Academy in 1976. Chandrasekharan has written several articles in periodicals about dances of India. His book on Bharatanatyam titled Natiya Nirishanam is a masterpiece: the culmination of a research work done with a Fellowship Award from the Cultural Department, government of India.

Personal life
Chandrasekharan married Mohanavalli Amma of Kalappurakkal family, Alangad Paravur, daughter of Gopala Panicker, assistant superintendent of police of former Travancore State. His wife took active participation in dance presentations. He died on 5 August 1998 at the age of 82.

External links

Dances of Kerala
Classical dance genres of India